Wings of Love is a 1976 album by The Temptations for the Gordy (Motown) label.

Background
Producer Jeffrey Bowen preferred Dennis Edwards to the rest of the group, and wanted to produce an Edwards solo album instead of a group album. As a result, Bowen de-emphasized the rest of the group's vocals and placed them at levels far below Edwards' leads, prompting his dismissal as the Temptations' producer after this album's release.  Unsurprisingly, Edwards sings lead on all but one of the songs on the album; "China Doll" has Richard Street taking the lead vocal.

Release
The album was an unsuccessful release, both commercially and critically. Wings of Love's only single, "Up the Creek (Without a Paddle)" was co-written by Sly Stone, the inspiration for many of the Temptations' late 1960s/early 1970s "psychedelic soul" records; because of tax reasons, he could not take a publishing credit on the song. Stone and other members of the Family Stone appear on "Up the Creek", as well as "Sweet Gypsy Jane" and "China Doll"

Track listing
All lead vocals by Dennis Edwards except where indicated

Side one
"Sweet Gypsy Jane" – 4:28
"Sweetness in the Dark" – 3:06
"Up the Creek (Without a Paddle)" – 3:28
"China Doll" – 3:26 (lead singer: Richard Street)

Side two
"Mary Ann" – 7:41
"Dream World (Wings of Love)" – 5:38
"Paradise" – 3:26

Personnel
 Dennis Edwards - tenor/baritone vocals
 Glenn Leonard - first tenor/falsetto vocals
 Richard Street - tenor/baritone vocals
 Melvin Franklin - bass vocals
 Otis Williams - tenor/baritone vocals
 Sly Stone, Truman Thomas - clavinet, organ and ARP
 Freddie Stewart - bass, guitar
 William "Billy Bass" Nelson - bass, guitar
 Rusty Allen - bass
 Ollie E. Brown - drums, percussion
 Pat Rizzo, Steve Madaio - trumpet
 Donald Charles Baldwin - Moog, Moog programming, keyboards, rhythm and vocal arrangements

Charts

References

1976 albums
The Temptations albums
Gordy Records albums
Albums produced by Jeffrey Bowen